The Women's 4x100m Medley Relay event at the 10th FINA World Aquatics Championships swam 26 July 2003 in Barcelona, Spain. Preliminary heats swam in the morning session, with the top-8 finishers advancing to swim again in the Final that evening.

At the start of the event, the World (WR) and Championship (CR) records were:
WR: 3:58.30 swum by the USA on September 23, 2000 in Sydney, Australia.
CR: 4:01.50 swum by Australia on July 29, 2001 in Fukuoka, Japan

Results

Final

Preliminaries

References

Swimming at the 2003 World Aquatics Championships
2003 in women's swimming